Tsega is an Ethiopian given name. Notable people with the name include:

Tsega Melaku (born 1968), Israeli author, journalist, and community activist
Tsega Gebre Beyene (born 1994), Ethiopian racing cyclist

See also
Tsegay

Ethiopian given names